Diocese of Patna may refer to:

Roman Catholic Archdiocese of Patna
Diocese of Patna (Church of North India)